Some Things Are Meant to Be is the fourth studio album by American country music singer Linda Davis. Her final studio album for Arista Records, it produced Davis's second-highest chart hit in its title track, a number 13 on the Billboard Hot Country Singles & Tracks (now Hot Country Songs) charts in 1996. "A Love Story in the Making" and "Walk Away" were also issued as singles. The former peaked at 33, while the latter failed to chart.

Two of this album's tracks were also recorded by other artists. "Cast Iron Heart" was originally recorded by Pearl River on their 1993 album Find Out What's Happening, and later by BlackHawk on their 1995 album Strong Enough. "What Do I Know" was recorded by Ricochet on their 1996 self-titled debut album, from which it was released as their debut single.

Track listing

Production
Produced & Mixed By John Guess
Engineered By Derek Bason, John Guess & Marty Williams
Mixing Assistant: Derek Bason
Mastered By Marty Williams

Personnel
Charlie Anderson — bass guitar
Michael Black — background vocals
Mark Casstevens — acoustic guitar, mandolin
Joe Chemay — bass guitar
Terry Crisp — steel guitar, Dobro
Linda Davis — lead vocals, background vocals
Larry Franklin — fiddle, mandolin
Vicki Hampton — background vocals
Scotty Hawkins — drums
John Hobbs — piano
Paul Hollowell — piano
Dann Huff — electric guitar
Steve Nathan — keyboards
Don Potter — acoustic guitar
Lang Scott — background vocals
Doug Sisemore — keyboards
Harry Stinson — background vocals
Kent Wells — acoustic guitar, electric guitar
Lonnie Wilson — drums

Chart performance

External links
[ Some Things Are Meant to Be] at Allmusic

1996 albums
Arista Records albums
Linda Davis albums